Hawklords were an English music group active between 1978 and 1979. Members were from Hawkwind, who were inactive during that period, (Robert Calvert – vocals, Dave Brock – guitar and Simon King – drums) and a local Devon group named Ark (Harvey Bainbridge – bass and Martin Griffin – drums) with the addition of former Pilot keyboardist Steve Swindells.

In 1978, the band released their first full studio album 25 Years On.

In 2008, a new Hawklords formed around bass player Harvey Bainbridge and ex-Hawkwind vocalist Ron Tree.

Live

The release of the album 25 Years On was promoted with a 41 date UK tour during October and November 1978. The stage show was designed by Barney Bubbles and was based on a Metropolis/Mao Tse-tung dystopia theme, featuring a projected film based light show, dancers in drab clothing performing mundane tasks, and spotlight towers creating an oppressive internment camp atmosphere. During the course of the tour the show was cut-back due to financial constraints, sufficiently upsetting Bubbles enough for him to refuse to work with Brock again. Some of the musicians felt that this action lightened the atmosphere resulting in the shows becoming more powerful. For the Hammersmith Odeon gig on 13 October, Lemmy guested on "Silver Machine".

The Brunel University, Uxbridge concert (24 November) was professionally filmed by Charisma Records, but to date only snippets have been aired on UK television. The Plymouth Polytechnic concert (23 November) was professionally recorded, and subsequent archive albums have included portions from it.

A tour programme was sold at this gig detailing the weird science behind the '25 Years' project. It outlined the aims and achievements of Pan Transcendental Industries and its programme for the industrialisation of religion. It described the construction of the first 'Metaphactory' staffed in part by car crash victims whose function was to generate new forms of social behaviour through the transformation of private into public fantasies. The nine million workers who populated this giant factory complex are described in the song 'The Age Of The Micro Man' wherein it is shown that they have no idea what they are working for. In fact the new rulers of this dark industrial age received contact from aliens that they believed were actually angels. These 'angels' said they would provide enlightenment, but at a price. The payment was nonsensical but nevertheless the human race was enslaved.

Set-list
The following set-list is that from the Hammersmith Odeon, 13 October 1978 performance. The set-list would slightly change during the course of the tour, significantly "Flying Doctor" being dropped halfway through.

Releases
Weird Tape 4
Recorded at Plymouth Polytechnic, 23 November 1978
June 1981, Weird Tapes, WEIRD104, UK cassette
September 2000, Voiceprint Records, HAWKVP9CD, UK CD
Hawklords Live
Recorded at Brunel University, Uxbridge, 24 November 1978. Also includes the additional track "Over The Top" from the Sonic Assassins concert
1992, Dojo Records, DOJOCD7, UK CD
May 1992, Griffin Records, GN03921-2, USA CD
Live '78
Recorded at Brunel University, Uxbridge, 24 November 1978
29 June 2009, Atomhenge (Cherry Red) Records, ATOMCD1014, UK CD

Tour dates
The band undertook a 42 date UK tour in October and November 1978, with support from Patrik Fitzgerald and The Softies.
6 October – Oxford, New Theatre
7 October – Manchester, Apollo
8 October – Liverpool, Empire
9 October – Edinburgh, Usher Hall
10 October – Newcastle, City Hall
11 October – Middlesbrough, Town Hall
13 October – London, Hammersmith Odeon – guest appearance from Lemmy
14 October – Milton Keynes, Leisure Centre
15 October – Croydon, Fairfield Halls
16 October – Portsmouth, Guild Hall
17 October – Birmingham, Odeon
18 October – Dunstable, Queensway Hall
19 October – Blackburn, King George Hall
20 October – Bristol, Colston Hall
21 October – St. Albans, City Hall
22 October – Ipswich, Gaumont
23 October – Leicester, De Montfort Hall
24 October – Sheffield, City Hall
25 October – Bradford, St. Georges Hall
26 October – Leeds, Queens Hall
27 October – Stoke-on-Trent, Victoria Hall
28 October – Paignton, Festival Theatre
29 October – Poole, Wessex Hall
2 November – Malvern, Winter Gardens
3 November – Cambridge, Corn Exchange
4 November – Ilford, Gants Hill Odeon
5 November – Reading, Hexagon
6 November – Cardiff, University
8 November – Gloucester, Leisure Centre
9 November – Folkestone, Leas Cliff Hall
10 November – Derby, Assembly Rooms
11 November – Nottingham, Heart of the Midlands (Rock City)
13 November – Hemel, Pavilion
15 November – Glasgow, Apollo
16 November – Carlisle, Market Hall
17 November – Lancaster, University
18 November – Oldham, Queen Elizabeth Hall
19 November – Blackburn, King George Hall
22 November – Wolverhampton, Civic Hall
23 November – Plymouth, Polytechnic – professionally recorded
24 November – Uxbridge, Brunel University – professionally filmed
25 November – Hastings, Pier Pavilion

Rockfield Studios, 1979
After the tour, the band were to tour North America, but Calvert, wishing for the return of King, dismissed Griffin who then concentrated on his studio business and playing for Richard Strange before returning to Hawkwind for the 1981 Sonic Attack album. Swindells recalls the five members spending time at Rockfield "where we rehearsed and jammed and wrote... Calvert was suffering definite mental problems when we were there. I think he was going through a divorce from his novelist wife, Pamela, and he was very unstable." Calvert left the band going on to write the novel Hype and recording an accompanying album, and he never appeared on any of the recordings released from these sessions.

Return to Hawkwind
Swindells wrote "Shot Down in the Night" at these sessions, and the band considered it ideal for single release, but with the band having no record contract Swindells departed when offered a solo deal, resulting in the album Fresh Blood. The remaining three members were joined by Huw Lloyd-Langton (lead guitar) and Tim Blake (synthesizers), choosing to revert to the name of Hawkwind and embarking upon a UK Winter 1979 tour resulting in the album Live Seventy Nine. Swindells' studio version and Hawkwind's live version of "Shot Down in the Night" were released as singles simultaneously in 1980, both featuring Lloyd-Langton and King.

The new Hawklords

In 2008 a new Hawklords formed around Harvey Bainbridge, with drummer Dave Pearce (ex-Bevis Frond), guitarist and keyboard player Jerry Richards, vocalist Ron Tree (ex-Hawkwind singer)  and bassist Tom Ashurst. The band's critically acclaimed 2015 album release, R:Evolution reached number 15 on the Official UK Top 30 Progressive Rock Chart and was in the top 75 for over two months. A “Full-blown sonic slab of classic British space-rock”, it has been nominated for best rock album of 2015 by One World Music Awards.

In 2016, the same line up, augmented by guest vocalist Kim McAuliffe, released the album Fusion (LORDS1016)

References

External links
Atomhenge Records
 

Hawkwind
English rock music groups
English space rock musical groups